Randolph Wemyss Memorial Hospital is a community hospital located in Buckhaven, Fife. It is managed by NHS Fife.

History
The original hospital was designed by Alexander Tod and opened on 28 August 1909. It was erected in memory of landowner Randolph Wemyss with his widow Lady Eva Wemyss providing £10,000. The hospital provided care for local people and mine workers injured working in the coal pits. This was also supported through donations from local businesses, churches, individuals and directly from the wages of local miners.

A major extension to the south, designed by John Holt, was completed in the 1960s.

In the 1990s, the general surgery transferred to the Victoria Hospital, Kirkcaldy. A review of services was carried out between 2002 and 2004.

The most recent upgrade was £4.45million, which was opened on 16 June 2008 by Nicola Sturgeon, MSP and Health Secretary. The new services including a men's health clinic, sexual health clinic, a Maggie's Centre outreach facility and integrated paediatric services.

Services
The hospital is a location for nursing students from the University of Dundee to undertake clinical placements. The University of St Andrews also arranges teaching at the hospital. Currently, the Wellesley unit provides care for long term conditions and end of life care through 16 continuing care in-patient beds. The hospital is the base for a range of community services, including: dental services, clinical psychology service, community rehabilitation service and 15 day care places, learning disability services, out of hours service and paediatric physiotherapy.

References

External links
 Official site
 Randolph Wemyss Memorial Hospital on Scotland’s Places
 Architecture details on RCAHMS

Hospital buildings completed in 1909
Hospital buildings completed in 1965
Hospital buildings completed in 2008
NHS Scotland hospitals
Hospitals in Fife
Health in Fife
1909 establishments in Scotland
NHS Fife